Roy Brown Jr. (October 30, 1916 – February 24, 2013) was a Canadian-American car designer and engineer, best known for creating the Edsel.

Automotive career
Brown was born in Hamilton, Ontario; he moved with his family to Detroit when he was in his teens. His father was an engineer for Chrysler.

Following his graduation from Detroit Art Academy in 1937, he was hired by General Motors as a designer in its Cadillac division, working alongside Bill Mitchell. "The first thing he designed was an instrument panel for the 1939 Cadillac," his son Reg told The Los Angeles Times.

After a stint in the U.S. Army, he was hired by Ford Motor Company, where he was assigned to oversee design of the 1955 Lincoln Futura, the model that would be transformed into TV's Batmobile a decade later. The Lincoln Futura was designed by William M. Schmidt of Ford Styling, who later became VP Styling at Studebaker-Packard Corp. in May, 1955.

Edsel
Ford next assigned Brown the task of designing a model that would appeal to buyers "with upscale tastes and mid-range budgets." Brown designed a car that "blared individuality." He rejected the tail fins prevalent in that era for rear lights shaped like boomerangs and gave the car a unique vertical front grille. According to Thomas E. Bonsall's book, Disaster in Dearborn (2002), it was assistant stylist Bob "Robin" Jones who suggested a vertical motif for the front end of the "E-car".

The model, named "Edsel" after Henry Ford's only child, rolled into showrooms in 1957, accompanied by a massive publicity campaign. But only 63,000 Edsels were sold in the first year of production, with its distinctive grille being the most criticized feature.

Post-Edsel

Brown gained attention in 1958 for creating the now-infamous "horse-collar" in response to engineers' concerns about engine cooling problems.

Ford transferred Brown to England, where he designed the 1962 Ford Cortina Mk1, which would become the automaker's best-selling car in Great Britain.

After returning to Detroit in 1966, Brown helped design Ford's Econoline van. He later became executive designer in the Lincoln Mercury division.

Brown remained a fan of the Edsel and drove an Edsel convertible into his 90s. "People would ask him, 'What the hell were you thinking when you designed that car?' He was never offended. He was proud of his creation," said Larry Nopper, a past president of the Southlanders Edsel Owners Club.

In 1983 he signed a picture he drew on a friend's cast, "it's better than the Edsel."

Brown retired from Ford in 1974. He died in Ann Arbor, Michigan, in 2013, from Parkinson's disease and Pneumonia.

References

1916 births
2013 deaths
American automobile designers
Ford designers
People from Hamilton, Ontario
United States Army personnel of World War II
Canadian emigrants to the United States